Kees Kuijs (born 4 October 1931) is a Dutch footballer. He played in 43 matches for the Netherlands national football team from 1955 to 1962.

References

1931 births
Living people
Dutch footballers
Netherlands international footballers
Place of birth missing (living people)
Association footballers not categorized by position